Luncavița is a commune in Tulcea County, Northern Dobruja, Romania. It is composed of two villages, Luncavița and Rachelu. It also included Văcăreni village until 2003, when it was split off to form Văcăreni Commune.

References

Communes in Tulcea County
Localities in Northern Dobruja
Place names of Slavic origin in Romania

eo:Luncaviţa